Anies Rasyid Baswedan (born 7 May 1969) is an Indonesian academic, activist, and politician who served as the Governor of Jakarta from 2017 to 2022, as an Independent. A student activist and political analyst before entering public service, he served as rector of Paramadina University before being appointed to be Minister of Education and Culture in Joko Widodo administration. He is also the founder of Indonesia Mengajar, a program that selects, trains, and assigns university graduates to serve in a one-year teaching mission across the country. He is the grandson of nationalist, journalist, and freedom fighter Abdurrahman Baswedan, and the cousin of Novel Baswedan.

Early life, family, and education

Early life and family 
Anies Rasyid Baswedan was born on 7 May 1969, in Kuningan, West Java. His father was Rasyid Baswedan, an ethnic Hadhrami-Javanese. While his mother was Aliyah Rasyid, an ethnic Sundanese mother. His grandfather, Abdurrahman Baswedan, was a prominent Arab-Indonesian activist who served as a cabinet minister during the Indonesian National Revolution. He married his wife, Fery in 1996. They have 4 children named Mutaria, Kaisar, Mikail and Ismail.

Education 
Anies grew up in Yogyakarta, attending SMP Negeri 5 and SMA Negeri 2 Yogyakarta. In 1987, he spent one year as an AFS Intercultural Programs exchange student in Milwaukee, Wisconsin. He returned to Indonesia, and enrolled at Gadjah Mada University, spending a summer attending Summer Session of Asian Studies at Sophia University in Tokyo, and graduating with a degree in business management. As a Fulbright Scholar, he went to receive his M.P.M. in international security and economic policy from the University of Maryland School of Public Policy (where he was a William P. Cole III Fellow), and Ph.D. in political science from Northern Illinois University, where he was a Gerald S. Maryanov Fellow.

Career

Paramadina University rector 
On 15 May 2007, he was appointed rector (equivalent of president) of Paramadina University, a private university in Jakarta. He succeeded Nurcholish Madjid (commonly referred to as Cak Nur), a prominent liberal Muslim intellectual and scholar who had served as rector since the university's founding in 1998. He became the youngest rector of an Indonesian university, at 38. As rector, Anies established Paramadina Fellowship and included anti-corruption education in the core curriculum, first of its kind in the country.

Indonesia Mengajar 
Anies rose to national prominence in 2009 when he initiated Indonesia Mengajar (Indonesia Teaching) foundation, a nationwide program that selects, trains, and assign university graduates to serve in a one-year teaching mission across the country. The program was established in response of unequal quality of education in Indonesia, particularly in the poor and rural parts of the archipelago. Anies remained in the leadership until 2013, when he resigned in order to pursue his political career.

Political career

Early political career 
Politically, Anies had been an independent during early years of his career. He moderated the first debate of 2009 presidential election. He also served in several capacities during Susilo Bambang Yudhoyono's administration. Baswedan served as official spokesperson for the so-called "Team of Eight", which was appointed by President Yudhoyono to oversee the infamous public feud between Corruption Eradication Commission and National Police, which saw two of the commissioners were criminally charged. In December 2011, he also served in a panel to select potential members of the General Elections Commission (KPU).

In 2010, alongside prominent figures like Hamengkubuwono X of Yogyakarta and former Muhammadiyah chairman Ahmad Syafi'i Maarif, Anies co-founded Nasdem, a mass organization. He left soon after it was declared a political party led by media mogul Surya Paloh. Nasdem went to win legislative seats in the 2014 legislative election, becoming part of the Widodo coalition.

Joko Widodo presidential campaign 
After his failed presidential bid, Baswedan joined the Joko Widodo presidential campaign, as an official spokesperson. Joko Widodo, a fellow Gadjah Mada University graduate, was said to believe that his presence would gather votes from Indonesian youth voters, a demographic closely affiliated with Anies.

Presidential transition 
After Joko Widodo was declared the winner of the presidential election by the KPU on July 22, 2014, Baswedan was then appointed the Deputy for the presidential transition office, led by Rini Soemarno. The transition team was intended to prepare the cabinet and perfect the program prior to the official appointment of Joko Widodo and Jusuf Kalla as President and Vice President, respectively. He helped the formation of the cabinet, working alongside Hasto Kristiyanto, Andi Widjajanto and Akbar Faizal; all but Kristiyanto eventually became Cabinet ministers.

Minister of Education and Culture 
After Joko Widodo's victory in the presidential election, Anies emerged as the front runner as the Minister of Education and Culture. And he was inaugurated on 27 October 2014, as a part of the Working Cabinet of President Joko Widodo. As minister, he postponed the implementation of the 2013 Curriculum and returning it to the previous 2006 Curriculum, changed the National Exam to become not a measure of graduation, but only as a mapping of the quality of regional education, established the National Examination Integrity Index to measure the honesty of students in each province, and established a Teacher Competency Test and Teacher Certification Program to improve teacher competence.

In the reshuffle of the Working Cabinet on 27 July 2016, Anies was replaced by Muhadjir Effendy, Chancellor of the Muhammadiyah University of Malang. The change was likely regarded as a purely a political accommodation, not due to performance factors. Though Baswedan was accused of also slightly deviating from the President's vision of not prioritizing the president's Smart Indonesia Card program.

Governor of Jakarta

Election and inauguration 

He entered in the 2017 Jakarta gubernatorial election, with Sandiaga Uno as his running mate. In the first round of voting on 15 February 2017, Anies secured passage to the second round run-off between two candidates, having secured approximately 40% of the vote, behind Basuki Tjahaja Purnama, the acting governor (known as Ahok), with 44%, and well ahead of Agus with 16%. On 19 April 2017 Anies won the runoff election, with approximately 58% of the votes, ahead of Ahok's 42%. In September 2017, it was announced that Anies' program will have an OK Trip for TransJakarta. He was officially inaugurated as governor on 16 October 2017, replacing interim governor Djarot Saiful Hidayat.

Controversies 
During his tenure as Governor of Jakarta, Anies attracted numerous controversies for his public statements. During his inauguration speech in 2017, he stated "pribumi" which was prohibited words on law. In 2018, he stated that water from rainfall must be returned to Earth, as the Lord wills, instead of being flowed out to the sea. He echoed similar remarks during his campaign for governorship in 2017. His policies regarding building permits on reclaimed land on the north of Jakarta and demolishing slums without permits have run contrary to his campaign promises in 2017. He also gained more controversy due to the mistake city officials made during the budgeting process, resulting in highly inflated prices such as Aibon glue that costs around 82 billion rupiah (around $6 million dollars). During his tenure, the city gave an award to Colosseum Club 1001, a nightclub in Kuningan, Jakarta. This award was later revoked when it was found that the club had numerous issues with drugs and narcotics.

Tenure 
In November 2017, he claimed that congestion in the Tanah Abang district was caused by pedestrians, instead of due to the street vendors conducting business on the area's sidewalks and roads. The city administration followed through by closing a 400-meter road stretch for traffic (except for TransJakarta buses) in order to accommodate the street vendors, against criticism from pedestrians, public transport drivers and regular vendors. Although some observers noted that the move might be a violation of national regulations, the street vendors and some city officials praised the move.

Anies in 2019 initiated a school meal program for Jakarta's schoolchildren, starting with 144,000 students in 459 schools that year.

COVID-19 

On January 7, 2020, when the coronavirus was still an epidemic in Wuhan, China, Anies anticipated the outbreak by informing through the DKI Jakarta Provincial Health Office to all hospitals in Jakarta to conduct research and detect any symptoms of pneumonia in Wuhan. The leadership meeting was held with the Immigration Foreigner Supervision Team to discuss the COVID-19 disease with the aim of knowing and anticipating people who came from the place of origin of the outbreak. Then, in February 2020, the DKI Jakarta Provincial Government monitored people who had symptoms of pneumonia, later being identified as COVID-19. Since January 2020, the number of people under monitoring or patients under surveillance continued to grow. After that, Anies issued Governor's Instruction No. 16 of 2020 concerning Increasing Awareness of the Risk of Transmission of Corona Virus Disease (COVID-19).

When the first two COVID-19 positive patients were detected in Indonesia, Anies announced the formation of a COVID-19 Response Team. Motor vehicle-free days were abolished to avoid crowds. This was followed by the abolition of learning activities at schools, the cessation of office operations, entertainment venues, and tourist destinations which he also closed in March 2020. The large-scale social restrictions (PSBB) were first implemented by the DKI Jakarta Provincial Government, as well as the first PSBB implemented in Indonesia.

On 16 March, MRT Jakarta, LRT and TransJakarta started to reduce number of trips, corridors and timetables (06.00 – 18.00), however, this policy was retracted due to long queue in many bus stops and train stations in morning. Odd-even policy will be halted during outbreak. On 20 March, Anies Baswedan declared a state of emergency in Jakarta for the next 14 days, lasting until 2 April. On 28 March, Jakarta provincial government extends the state of emergency until 19 April. On 2 April, Anies Baswedan allocated IDR 3 trillion to fight the COVID-19 pandemic, and the budget will be used to fund the city's fight against the virus up until May this year, by gradually allocating IDR 1.3 trillion and an additional IDR 2 trillion Jakarta's application for curfew was approved by the Ministry of Health on 7 April and is set to take effect from Friday, 10 April for at least two weeks. On 21 April, the local government prepared 136 schools as isolation areas for COVID-19 and the policy is currently still a proposal waiting for approval from the Education Office. On 9 September, Anies decided to reimpose large-scale social restrictions starting from 14 September due to the high spike of COVID-19 cases in the province.

On 1 December 2020, it was confirmed that Anies tested positive for COVID-19 after undergoing an RT-PCR test the day before. He claims to be asymptomatic. He will work remotely, but not at his own home, while in isolation for two weeks. The test and the announcement came after his deputy, Ahmad Riza Patria, was also known to have contracted the virus. The contract tracing team of the Jakarta Health Agency has said that Anies may have been infected from a member of his private staff, who in turn may have been infected from a relative.

Awards

Personal life

Marriage and children 
Anies married Fery Farhati Ganis, a psychology graduate from Gadjah Mada University, on May 11, 1996. She received her master's degree in parenting education from Northern Illinois University. Together, they have four children.

Relatives 
His father, Rasyid Baswedan, is a lecturer at the Faculty of Economics of the Islamic University of Indonesia. While his mother, Aliyah Rashid is a professor at the Faculty of Social and Economic Sciences of Yogyakarta State University. He is also the grandson of nationalist, journalist, and freedom fighter Abdurrahman Baswedan, a journalist and diplomat who served as Deputy Minister of Information during the national revolution. He is also the first cousin of corruption investogator Novel Baswedan, who was injured in an acid attack in 2017.

References

External links 

  
  
  Leadership is as important as GPA
  

1969 births
Living people
Indonesian people of Yemeni descent
Gadjah Mada University alumni
Javanese people
Governors of Jakarta
Indonesian academics
Hadhrami people
Indonesian educators
University of Maryland, College Park alumni
Education ministers of Indonesia
People from Kuningan
Sundanese people
People from Yogyakarta
Indonesian Muslims
Fulbright alumni
Academic staff of Yogyakarta State University